Yendry Díaz Pérez (born 5 June 1987 in Matanzas) is a Cuban footballer.

Career

Professional
After several unsuccessful trials with various Major League Soccer clubs, Diaz signed with the Real Maryland Monarchs in the USL Second Division on April 15, 2009.

Diaz signed with the new USSF Division 2 team FC Tampa Bay in January 2010. The club joined the North American Soccer League in 2011. After spending the 2011 season with FC Tampa Bay, the club announced on October 4, 2011 that it would not re-sign Diaz for the 2012 season.

International
Diaz has numerous caps for Cuba national U-23 football team and made his senior international debut for Cuba in a February 2008 friendly match against Guyana. He earned his second and final cap two days later against the same opposition.

Personal life
Díaz was born to Julio Diaz and Dinora Perez and has a younger sister, still living in Cuba.

Diaz defected to the United States from Cuba just after his team's Olympic qualifying game against the United States on March 11, 2008, along with several teammates, including Loanny Cartaya. Diaz apparently slipped out of his hotel in the middle of the night and traveled by car to West Palm Beach.

References

External links
 
Real Maryland Monarchs bio
2 Months After Flight, No Asylum, No Regret Article in Tampa Bay Online

1985 births
Living people
Sportspeople from Matanzas
Defecting Cuban footballers
Association football defenders
Cuban footballers
Cuba international footballers
FC Matanzas players
Real Maryland F.C. players
Tampa Bay Rowdies players
USL Second Division players
USSF Division 2 Professional League players
Cuban expatriate footballers
Cuban expatriate sportspeople in the United States
Expatriate soccer players in the United States
Cuba under-20 international footballers